Yūgure, (夕暮れ, Japanese for 'twilight'), may refer to:

 , the name of several Japanese ships
 "Yugure" (song), by The Blue Hearts
 Yūgure Maeda (1883–1951), a Japanese tanka poet

See also 
 Twilight (disambiguation)
 Yūgure made (夕暮まで), a 1980 Japanese film